Samsonovo is a rural locality (a selo) and the administrative center of Samsonovsky Selsoviet, Shipunovsky District, Altai Krai, Russia. The population was 750 as of 2013. There are 11 streets.

Geography 
Samsonovo is located 41 km ESE of Shipunovo (the district's administrative centre) by road. Chupino is the nearest rural locality.

References 

Rural localities in Shipunovsky District